Harindarpal Singh Banga, known as Harry, is an Indian entrepreneur and philanthropist. He is the Founder, Chairman, and CEO of The Caravel Group Limited, a global conglomerate engaged primarily in resources trading, the provision of maritime services, and asset management. The Caravel Group Ltd owns Fleet Management Limited, a renowned ship management companies, of which Harry Banga is also Chairman.

According to Forbes, as at April 2022, Banga has a net worth of $2.8 billion and is ranked as the 1,196th richest person in the world.

Early life
Born in Amritsar, India, and raised in Chandigarh, Harindarpal Banga was educated at the Training Ship Dufferin, India’s oldest maritime academy. He earned his Master Mariner certification in 1976 and was commanding merchant vessels by the age of 27.

Banga began his career in the maritime industry before going into the commodities business. Prior to forming Caravel together with his two sons, he was Vice-Chairman of the Noble Group Limited, a global commodities trading business.

In 1979 Banga joined the Gulf Group in Hong Kong – where he still lives – as Operations Manager. The Gulf Group was a Geneva-based international shipping and commodities business.

The Noble Group 
Banga left Gulf in 1989, and became an early partner in Noble Group Limited in cooperation with Richard Elman, helping to establish and lead Noble Chartering Limited. Noble Group was a supply chain manager of agricultural, industrial and energy products, and Asia's largest commodities trader. Following Noble Group’s Hong Kong listing in 1994, Banga served as Vice-Chairman of the Group, and despite a low public profile, is widely credited as the driving force behind much of Noble’s success. His 21 years with Noble, as it rose into the Fortune 100, made Banga a wealthy man and earned him a place on the Forbes billionaires list as one of Hong Kong’s 40 richest men. 
In 2010 Banga stepped down as Vice-Chairman of Noble Group Ltd but remained on the Board as Vice-Chairman Emeritus. In 2011 he purchased the Noble Group’s ship management arm, Fleet Management Limited, from Noble. He severed his ties with Noble in 2012.

The Caravel Group
Planning for a quiet retirement, Banga was instead persuaded by his sons Angad and Guneet – whose background is in asset management – to join them in a new venture in 2013. Hong Kong-based Caravel Group Limited is a diversified global conglomerate with three main lines of business. Banga has been Chairman and CEO of the Group since its inception.
Caravel Maritime – into which Fleet Management Limited was injected in 2014 – encompasses the Group’s maritime interests. With more than 550 vessels under management, Fleet Management is one of the world’s largest third-party ship management businesses. Caravel Maritime also includes Caravel Shipping, which provides in-house and third-party dry bulk commercial and chartering services, as well as maritime asset ownership – Caravel has a growing fleet of its own vessels – and other maritime investments.
Caravel Resources is engaged in the trading of industrial dry bulk commodities, with a focus on raw materials for steel making and power generation – principally iron ore, coal and coke.
Caravel Asset Management makes direct investments in global liquid asset classes, as well as alternative investments such as private equity and hedge funds. Its portfolio includes strategic investments in selected growth businesses such as Nykaa in India and Young Master Brewery in Hong Kong. It operates with a strong focus on risk management to sustain returns through market volatility.

Philanthropy 
Harry Banga is known for his philanthropy, exercised primarily through The Caravel Group’s charitable arm, The Caravel Foundation Limited. The Caravel Foundation awards scholarships to help deserving students attending Dartmouth College, Duke University and Princeton University. In Hong Kong, it has a close partnership with the City University of Hong Kong (CityU). The University’s Indra & Harry Banga Gallery is named after Harry Banga and his wife Indra. Always a supportive partner in Harry’s activities, Indra Banga is a Director of both The Caravel Group and The Caravel Foundation.

Other positions and honours
Fellow of The Institute of Chartered Shipbrokers.
Former member of the Executive Committee of the Hong Kong Shipowners Association.
Honored in 2011 with the Pravasi Bharatiya Samman Award, the highest distinction conferred by the Indian government on overseas Indians.
In 2018 the National Maritime Day Celebrations Committee and the Directorate General of Shipping, India, honored Banga with the NMD Award of Excellence.
Honorary Fellow of City University of Hong Kong, conferred in October 2018.
Honorary Doctor in Business Administration for his significant contributions to education and the well-being of society from the City University of Hong Kong (CityU), conferred in August 2020
Member of the Court of City University of Hong Kong.
Named as a “Most Influential Business Leader of Asia” by The Economic Times in 2019

References

Year of birth missing (living people)
Living people
Hong Kong people of Indian descent
Indian billionaires
Indian chairpersons of corporations
21st-century Indian philanthropists
People from Amritsar
People from Chandigarh
Recipients of Pravasi Bharatiya Samman